Marilynessa yulei is a species of snail in the family Camaenidae.

Distribution
This species is endemic to Queensland, Australia.

References 

 Hedley, C. 1889. Notes on the Helicidae. Proceedings of the Royal Society of Queensland 6: 120-121
 Stanisic, J., Shea, M., Potter, D. & Griffiths, O. 2010. Australian Land Snails. A field guide to eastern Australian species. Mauritius : Bioculture Press Vol. 1 595 pp.

External links
 Forbes E. (1852). On the Mollusca collected by Mr MacGillivray during the voyage of the Rattlesnake. Pp. 360-386, pls 2-3, in: MacGillivray J. (ed.). Narrative of the voyage of the H.M.S. Rattlesnake, commanded by the late Captain Owen Stanley, during the years 1846-1850, volume 2 . London: T. & W. Boone. 395 pp
 
 Cox, J. C. (1870). Descriptions of eight new species of shells from Australia and the Solomon Islands. Proceedings of the Zoological Society of London. 1870: 170-172
 Pilsbry H.A. (1890-1891). Manual of conchology, structural and systematic, with illustrations of the species, Second series: Pulmonata. Vol. VI. Helicidae Vol. IV. pp. 1-64, pls 1-15 [27 May 1890], pp. 65–128, pls 16-30 [12 Aug 1890], pp. 129–192. pls 31-47 [16 Dec 1890], pp. 193–324, pls 48-69 [19 May 1891]. Philadelphia: Conchological Section, Academy of Natural Sciences

Gastropods of Australia
Gastropods described in 1852